Timothy S. "Ripper" Owens (born September 13, 1967) is an American heavy metal singer who currently performs with KK's Priest, Spirits of Fire, the Three Tremors and A New Revenge. He first gained attention as the lead singer of Judas Priest and then Iced Earth. He took the nickname "Ripper" from the Judas Priest song "The Ripper" during his time in the tribute band British Steel. 

In 2020, Owens was announced as the frontman for the band KK's Priest, which also featured former Judas Priest members KK Downing and Les Binks.

Early life
Owens was born on September 13, 1967, in Akron, Ohio. He graduated from Kenmore High School in 1985.

Career

Brainicide and Winter's Bane/British Steel
Owens began his musical career as the singer for Brainicide, a thrash metal band based in his home town of Akron, Ohio that had also been known as Dammage, Inc. He recorded 3 demo tapes with them before the band split in 1989. Prior to joining Judas Priest in 1996, Owens fronted a band called Winter's Bane, with whom he recorded an album called Heart of a Killer in 1993. He was most prominent in his role as the frontman of Judas Priest tribute band British Steel, named after the Judas Priest album, although the bands Winter's Bane and British Steel were actually one and the same. The band would often open their shows as Winter's Bane in order to introduce the audience to their original material. After finishing their original set, they would then take a break, which included a wardrobe change to emulate the subject of their tribute, Judas Priest. Winter's Bane sound engineer Ken Reffner would come out from behind the soundboard, adding a fifth member to the stage. Reffner can be seen playing the part of K. K. Downing with British Steel in the Judas Priest episode of VH1's Behind the Music.

Judas Priest

Owens made headlines in 1996 when he went from being a fan of the English heavy metal band Judas Priest to being their lead singer, replacing Rob Halford. Despite numerous rumors that Halford would reunite with Priest, Owens recorded two studio albums with his childhood heroes, as well as two live albums and a 2002 DVD release. Owens also helped write one Judas Priest song, "What's My Name?", which was a bonus track on Demolition. With Judas Priest, he was nominated once for the Grammy Award for Best Metal Performance in 1999, with the song "Bullet Train" from the album Jugulator, but lost to Metallica's "Better than You".

Rock Star
The movie Rock Star (2001), about a tribute band singer who is asked to join the band he has tried to imitate, was loosely based on Owens' career. Judas Priest disavowed the movie after they were denied creative control in the screenplay and script. For example, in Rock Star the band throws out their original singer while on tour and replaces him a few days later; while in real life, Rob Halford was not thrown out, but left Judas Priest, four years before he was replaced. Owens said of the movie, "They fabricated things and decided to pull away from my story and make their own because I guess mine was too normal. There's no telling what they put in there. If I could sue, I would."

Iced Earth and Yngwie Malmsteen's Rising Force
Judas Priest reunited with Rob Halford in 2003. Owens seized opportunity when, that same year, vocalist Matt Barlow quit Iced Earth. Iced Earth's first album with Owens, The Glorious Burden, came out in early 2004. While singing with Judas Priest, Owens had toured with Iced Earth (and Anthrax) in 2001, but the tour was cut short. In 2006, Owens also reunited with his former Winter's Bane colleague Dennis Hayes in a band called Beyond Fear. The self-titled debut album from his new band was released in May of that year. Hayes would join Iced Earth as well in 2007 after bassist James "Bo" Wallace left due to family health issues.

Owens' stay in Iced Earth was short, however, as on December 11, 2007, guitarist Jon Schaffer announced that Owens would be leaving the band; Matt Barlow had been invited to return to the line-up after heavy feedback from fans.

On February 26, 2008, it was announced that Owens would be the new lead singer for Yngwie Malmsteen's Rising Force, replacing Doogie White. Owens quit Malmsteen's band in 2012, saying there were conflicts in show dates between his solo band and Yngwie's touring, but that he would be open to the possibility of working with him again.

In May 2009, Owens released his first solo album, Play My Game. The album featured many prominent metal musicians. A European tour followed in 2010, accompanied by musicians Anders Buaas (guitar), Jon Vegard Naess (guitar), Are Gogstad (bass), and Henrik "Rick" Hagan (drums).

Charred Walls of the Damned, HAIL! and Dio Disciples

Owens now fronts a new project called Charred Walls of the Damned, a band founded in 2009 by Richard Christy, radio personality on The Howard Stern Show and former drummer for Iced Earth and Death. The origin of the band's name was explained on May 20, 2009. It derives from a series of radio prank calls Christy made to a Christian radio station. In response to the pranks they received, the host described how he prays for them, thus "saving their soul to be saved by God's grace...not in the devil's hell where you'd be putting your nails in the charred walls of the damned". The band features Christy on drums and Owens on vocals, along with Steve Di Giorgio (bass guitar) and Jason Suecof (lead guitar). The band's debut self-titled album was released on February 2, 2010 through Metal Blade Records. 

Owens is also a member of a cover band called HAIL!. HAIL!'s rotating cast of members include Owens, Andreas Kisser, Paul Bostaph, David Ellefson, Mike Portnoy, Jimmy DeGrasso, and Roy Mayorga. Owens, DeGrasso, Ellefson, and Kisser formed the band in late 2008. They toured Europe in 2009, June 2010, and came together to perform at a benefit for Deftones bassist Chi Cheng in 2010. The lineup consisted of Owens, Portnoy, Mark Anthony of the Letter Black, Phil Demmel of Machine Head, and Ellefson. HAIL! is on their second European tour with the lineup Andreas Kisser, Owens, Paul Bostaph, and James LoMenzo. Due to the death of previously announced bassist Paul Gray, LoMenzo agreed on one day's notice to fly to Portugal for the Rock in Rio festival where HAIL! was scheduled to perform on May 30, 2010. 

In early 2011, Owens also joined Dio Disciples, which features former Dio members.

Other projects
Other music projects of Owens include Project Rock with Keri Kelli, Rudy Sarzo, James Kottak, and Teddy Zig Zag.

Owens owned "Ripper's Rock House", a sports eatery, restaurant and entertainment venue, in Akron, Ohio. In August 2015, Bar Rescue filmed and transformed the bar into "Tim Owens' Traveler's Tavern" The venue closed permanently in September 2016.

He was also the owner of "Ripper Owens Tap House", the predecessor to "Ripper's Rock House", in Akron's Firestone Park neighborhood.

In 2015, Owens recorded music for the fictional band Witches' Lips for the heavy metal horror film Hairmetal Shotgun Zombie Massacre: The Movie. He recorded and wrote the lyrics with guitarist Marzi Montazeri of Philip H. Anselmo and The Illegals.

Ted Kirkpatrick, drummer and songwriter for the Christian metal band Tourniquet, announced on July 25, 2018, that Owens would be doing lead vocals for all the songs (except the title track "Gazing at Medusa") on their next album. The album, Gazing at Medusa, was released on October 16, 2018.

During the late 1990s and early 2000s Owens was part of a Grunge themed tribute band called Seattle, playing covers of Nirvana, Soundgarden, Alice in Chains, Pearl Jam, and other Grunge bands of the era.

In December 2022, Owens released a solo album under the name 'Ripper', titled 'Return to Death Row'

Discography

With Brainicide
(Compilation) Heavy Artillery k7 (1990) (Song: "Payment in Blood")
 Brutal Mentality K7 Demo (1990)

With Winter's Bane
Heart of a Killer (1993)

With Judas Priest
Studio Albums
Jugulator (1997)
Demolition (2001)

Live Albums
'98 Live Meltdown (1998)
Live in London (2003)

With Iced Earth
The Glorious Burden (2004)
Framing Armageddon (Something Wicked Part 1) (2007)

With Beyond Fear
Beyond Fear (2006)

With Yngwie Malmsteen's Rising Force
Perpetual Flame (2008)
Relentless (2010)

Solo
Play My Game (2009)
Embattled (2021)
Return to Death Row (EP) (2022)

With Charred Walls of the Damned
Charred Walls of the Damned (2010)
Cold Winds on Timeless Days (2011)
Creatures Watching Over the Dead (2016)

With the Three Tremors
The Three Tremors (2019)
Guardians of the Void (2021)

With Spirits of Fire
Spirits of Fire (2019)

With A New Revenge
Enemies & Lovers (2019)

With KK's Priest
Sermons of the Sinner (2021)

Tribute albums
Kickstart My Heart: A Tribute to Mötley Crüe (song: "Louder than Hell", backing vocals only)
One Way Street: A Tribute to Aerosmith (song: "Round and Round")
Michael Schenker - Heavy Hitters (vocals on "War Pigs" by Black Sabbath)
Numbers from the Beast: An All Star Salute to Iron Maiden (song: "Flight of Icarus")
Bat Head Soup: A Tribute to Ozzy (song: "Mr. Crowley")
Butchering the Beatles: A Headbashing Tribute (song: "Hey Jude")
Hell Bent Forever: A Tribute to Judas Priest (song: "Exciter")
Sin-Atra (song: "Witchcraft")
Ronnie James Dio – This Is Your Life (Japanese edition) (song: "Stand Up and Shout (Live)")
Immortal Randy Rhoads – The Ultimate Tribute Album (2015) (8 of 11 songs)
The Doom in Us All - A Tribute to Black Sabbath (song: "Children of the Grave")

Other appearances
Renegade Angel - Damnation (2021) lead and backing vocals on "Damnation"
Spawn - Round 2 (production, 1998)
Soulbender - Demo (2008)
Ellefson, Bittner, Grigsby & Owens - Leave It Alone (memorial track for Dimebag Darrell, iTunes release) (2008)
Roadrunner United - The Concert (DVD, live, 2008) - vocals on "Curse of the Pharaohs" by Mercyful Fate, "Abigail" by King Diamond, and "Allison Hell" by Annihilator
We Wish You a Metal Xmas and a Headbanging New Year - vocals on "Santa Claus Is Back in Town" by Elvis Presley
Avantasia - The Wicked Symphony (2010)
The Claymore - Damnation Reigns (2010) - vocals on "Behind Enemy Lines"
Memorain - Evolution (2011)
Ralf Scheepers - Scheepers (2011) - vocals on "Remission of Sin"
Desdemon - Through the Gates (2011) - vocals on "The Burning Martyr"
Infinita Symphonia - A Mind's Chronicle (2011)
Wolfpakk - Wolfpakk (2011) - vocals on "Wolfony"
Absolute Power - Absolute Power (2011)
SoulSpell - Hollow's Gathering (2012)
T&N - Slave to the Empire (2012) - vocals on "Kiss of Death"
Maegi - Skies Fall (2013)
Marius Danielsen - The Legend of Valley Doom Part 1 (2014)
SoulSpell - We Got the Right (Helloween 30 Years Tribute) (2015)
Carthagods - Carthagods (2015) - vocals on "My Favourite Disguise"
Operation: Mindcrime - Resurrection (2015) - vocals on "Taking on the World"
Trick or Treat - Rabbits' Hill Pt. 2 - vocals on "They Must Die"
Europica - Part One (2017) - vocals on "The Patriot" and "Unsounded Crosses"
Metal Allegiance - Metal Allegiance (2016) - co-lead vocals on "We Rock"
Trigger Pig - Sands of Time (Single, 2017) - lead vocals
Jano Baghoumian - "The End of Prance" (symphonic poem album, 2018) - lead vocals
Tourniquet - Gazing at Medusa (album, 2018) - lead vocals on all but the title track
Thousand Oxen Fury - Victory March (2020) - guest vocals on "Sink This Ship, Save My Soul"
Tourniquet - Gethsemane, (single, 2020)
Alogia (band) - Semendria (2020) - guest vocals on "Eternal Fight"
Barry Kuzay - The Movers of the World (2021) - lead vocals on "Wyatt's Torch" 
Offensive - Awenasa (2021) - lead vocals on "Blind Ambition"
Leviathan Project - Sound of Galaxies (2021)
Engineered Society Project - Digital Soldiers (2021)
My Own Maker - The Save Word (2021)
Pyramid - Validity (2021)
Nergard - Eternal White (2021) - guest vocals on "Now Barely Three"
Ashes of Ares - Emperors And Fools (2022) - guest vocals on "Monster's Lament"
Brutality in Buddha - Crank it up from 9 to 11 (2021) song about lizard people and 9/11 conspiracy, lyrics by Ted Wray of Brutality in Buddha, band from Buddha,Indiana vocals sung by Ted Wray and shrieks of metal by Tim Ripper Owens

References

External links

 [http://www.joekleon.com/ripper.html 2005 and 2006 radio interviews with Owens]
 Owens interviewed by Highwire Daze'' (2006)
 "A Metal-Head Becomes A Metal-God. Heavy" – New York Times article on Owens

1967 births
Musicians from Akron, Ohio
American heavy metal singers
American male singers
Judas Priest members
Living people
Singers from Ohio
Iced Earth members
Soulbender members
Charred Walls of the Damned members
Yngwie J. Malmsteen's Rising Force members